Unit 543 was a secret Imperial Japanese Army facility at Hailar that focused on the development of biological weapons during World War II. It was operated by the Kempeitai, the Japanese military police.

See also
Japanese war crimes
List of Japanese War Atrocities 
Kantogun
Second Sino-Japanese War

References

Japanese biological weapons program
Imperial Japanese Army
Japanese human subject research
Second Sino-Japanese War crimes
War crimes in China